Gayla Drake (born December 3, 1964 in Iowa) is an American guitarist and singer/songwriter.

Biography
Drake was born in Iowa on December 3, 1964. She began playing the guitar at the age of 4, and performed Old-time music, Bluegrass music and Celtic music throughout her formative years, finally recording her first CD of original music in 1994. She has released 14 additional recordings since that time, along with music for public television and independent films. She was interim managing editor of Premier Guitar Magazine for several months in 2009.

Discography
1995 – Gayla Drake Paul
1995 – Waiting for the Spark
1997 – How Can I Keep From Singing?
1999 – A Woman’s Touch
2005 – The Time Between Times
2000 – The Next Hill
2002 – Retrospective
2005 – Restless
2005 – I Know This Road
2005 – Broken Blues
2005 – The Joy Tree
2006 – Here in the Center of the World with Eric Douglas
2006 – Ethik: Blues and Mud Flowers
2007 – The Wheel
2008 – Pour Me

External links
Gayla Drake website

American women singer-songwriters
Living people
American acoustic guitarists
1964 births
Place of birth missing (living people)
Guitarists from Iowa
20th-century American guitarists
20th-century American women guitarists
21st-century American women
Singer-songwriters from Iowa